Meghmallar (also known in English as Raincoat) is a 2014 Bangladeshi drama film directed by Zahidur Rahim Anjan. The film is an adaption of writer Akhtaruzzaman Elias's story titled "Raincoat". It was screened in the Discovery section of the 2015 Toronto International Film Festival. It was screened at 51st International Film Festival of India in January 2021 in the Country in Focus section.

Plot
An ordinary family of a chemistry teacher at a suburban government college Nurul Huda, his wife Asma, daughter Sudha and Asma's brother Mintu goes through a life-altering experience during Liberation War of Bangladesh in 1971. It happens when Mintu leaves to join the Freedom Fighters one morning. Asma secretly continues to correspond with her brother not sharing this. One rainy day, Nurul goes to a school function wearing Mintu's raincoat to protect him from the ceaseless rains. Government forces arrest him on suspicion of being a revel and took him into custody. Nurul is then forced to make a decision that affect both the destiny of his family and whole country.

Cast
 Shahiduzzaman Selim as Nurul Huda, a chemistry teacher at a suburban government college
 Aparna Ghosh as Asma, Nurul Huda's wife
 Jayanta Chattopadhyay as Mintu, Asma's brother
 Marjan Hossain Zara as Sudha, Nurul Huda and Asma's daughter
 Mosharraf Karim as
 Mostafiz Shahin as Pakistani Military Personnel
 Adnan Sobhan Evan as Pakistani Military Personnel

Production
This film was made under the banner of Bengal Creations Ltd. The music for the film is directed by Abhijit Basu from Kolkata (India).

References

External links
 
 Meghmallar at the Bangla Movie Database

2014 films
2014 drama films
2014 directorial debut films
2010s Bengali-language films
Bengali-language Bangladeshi films
Bangladeshi drama films
Films based on the Bangladesh Liberation War